George Seymour Lyon (July 27, 1858 – May 11, 1938) was a Canadian golfer, an Olympic gold medalist in golf, an eight-time Canadian Amateur Championship winner, and a member of Canada's Sports Hall of Fame. He worked in the insurance industry.

Early life, cricket
Lyon was born in Richmond, Ontario, near Ottawa. His early sporting career was in cricket, where, as a batsman he represented Canada eight times, averaging 14.07, and scoring 238 not out in a club game, at that time the highest score ever made in Canada.

Golf career
Although he only began playing golf at the age of 38, due to lack of available golf courses in most areas of Canada before that date, he won the gold medal in golf in the 1904 Summer Olympics in St. Louis, Missouri, at age 46, only eight years after beginning the sport. He won the Canadian Amateur Championship a record eight times between 1898 and 1914, the last time in his 56th year. He was also runner-up in that event on two further occasions. He won the Canadian Seniors' Golf Association Championship ten times between 1918 and 1930, the final time in his 72nd year; these events were staged before the inauguration of the Canadian Senior Golf Championship by Golf Canada. 

Lyon lost in the finals of the 1906 U.S. Amateur, in his 48th year, and in the round of 32 of the 1908 British Amateur, when in his 50th year. He was a lifelong amateur golfer, never turning professional.

He traveled to London in 1908 to defend his Olympic title, but plans to stage a golf tournament there were cancelled at the last minute, since representatives from England and Scotland were unable to agree on the format. Offered the gold medal by default, Lyon refused to accept it. Golf did not return to the Olympics until 2016.

Lyon was also a founding member, with Albert Austin, of the Lambton Golf and Country Club in Toronto. It was officially opened on June 13, 1903.

Lyon often partnered with the future Canadian golf hall of fame member, professional George Cumming; as a pair they were a difficult team to beat in 4-ball matches.

Death and legacy
Lyon died in Toronto, Ontario, in 1938 and was buried in Toronto's Mount Pleasant Cemetery. In 1955, Lyon was inducted into Canada's Sports Hall of Fame. In 1971, he was inducted into the Canadian Golf Hall of Fame.

A fictionalized version of Lyon, portrayed by Kevin Jubinville, is a supporting character in "A Case of the Yips", a 2016 episode of the Canadian series Murdoch Mysteries. The episode is set in 1903 -- Lyon mentions his planned upcoming trip to the 1904 Olympics in St. Louis. A running gag through the episode is that as Lyon advises Detective Murdoch about golf, he is also a pushy insurance salesman, trying to talk Murdoch into buying a policy.

The Golf Association of Ontario annually runs the George S. Lyon team championship for its men's club teams.

His life and achievement as an Olympic Gold medalist are described in the 2016 book "Olympic Lyon" by Michael G. Cochrane.

Lyon reigned as the Olympic champion for 112 years, until golf returned to the program at the 2016 Summer Olympics, the gold medal being won by Englishman Justin Rose.

Tournament wins 
1898 Canadian Amateur
1900 Canadian Amateur
1903 Canadian Amateur
1905 Canadian Amateur
1906 Canadian Amateur
1907 Canadian Amateur
1912 Canadian Amateur
1914 Canadian Amateur

Results in major championships

Note: Lyon only played in the British Open, U.S. Amateur, and the British Amateur.

NT = No tournament
CUT = missed the half-way cut
DNQ = Did not qualify for match play portion
R64, R32, R16, QF, SF = Round in which player lost in match play

Sources: U.S. Open and U.S. Amateur, 1905 Open, 1905 Amateur, 1908 Amateur.

References

Sources
Cochrane, Michael G. (2016) Olympic Lyon, georgelyon.ca.

External links

George Seymour Lyon  at The Canadian Encyclopedia
Profile at Canadian Golf Hall of Fame
George Seymour Lyon
Olympic Lyon - The Story of George Lyon

Canadian male golfers
Amateur golfers
Olympic golfers of Canada
Golfers at the 1904 Summer Olympics
Olympic medalists in golf
Olympic gold medalists for Canada
Medalists at the 1904 Summer Olympics
Golfing people from Ontario
Cricketers from Ontario
Sportspeople from Ottawa
1858 births
1938 deaths